The DeGraff Building is a commercial building in Colorado Springs, Colorado. It is "one of the few remaining commercial buildings dating from the boom period following the Cripple Creek gold strike." The building is on the National Register of Historic Places.

History
David DeGraff, a California gold rush miner, had the building constructed in 1897. It was designed by Barber and Hastings, who also designed the 1890-1891 renovations to the El Paso Club on 30 Platte Avenue. Retail shops were on the first floor of the DeGraff Building and offices were on the second, third and fourth floors. The building was converted into an apartment house after World War II. In 1967 it was converted back to offices. In 1982 the building was restored; The parapet that had been removed was recreated and the rock aggregate veneer that had been applied to the front facade was removed.

The Colorado Springs Business Journal first began in the DeGraff Building in 1989. Oskar blues is currently located on the first floor.

See also
 History of Colorado Springs, Colorado

References

Commercial buildings on the National Register of Historic Places in Colorado
Colorado State Register of Historic Properties
Buildings and structures in Colorado Springs, Colorado
Office buildings completed in 1897
National Register of Historic Places in Colorado Springs, Colorado